This page covers all relevant details regarding PFC Cherno More Varna for all official competitions inside the 2015–16 season. These are the Bulgarian Supercup, A Group, Bulgarian Cup and UEFA Europa League.

Transfers

In

Out

Loans out

Squad information

Competitions

Overall

Competition record

Start formations

Accounts for all competitions. Numbers constitute according game of the competition in which the formation was used, NOT number of occurrences.

Most used starting XI.

Minutes on the pitch
Includes injury time.  Positions indicate the most natural position of the particular player, followed by alternative positions where he actually started games during the course of the season.

Correct as of match played on 22 May 2016.

Débuts
Players making their first team Cherno More début in a competitive match.

Goalscorers 

Last updated: 22 May 2016

Assists 

Last updated: 22 May 2016

Goalscorers' effectiveness

Goals per game 
Includes games in all official competitions.  Substitute appearances count as a game played.

Correct as of match played on 22 May 2016.

Minutes per goal 
Takes into account the actual time spent on the pitch (including injury time) in all official competitions.

Correct as of match played on 22 May 2016.

Own goals

Penalties

Captains 

Correct as of match played on 22 May 2016.

Clean sheets 

Last updated: 22 May 2016

Disciplinary record 

Correct as of 22 May 2016 
Players are listed in descending order of 
Players with the same amount of cards are listed by their position on the club's official website

Suspensions served

Injuries

Players in bold are still out from their injuries.  Players listed will/have miss(ed) at least one competitive game (missing from whole match day squad).

International call-ups

Home attendances
Correct as of match played on 14 May 2016.

{| class="wikitable sortable" style="text-align:center; font-size:90%"
|-
!width=100 | Comp
!width=120 class="unsortable" | Date
!width=60 | Score
!width=250 class="unsortable" | Opponent
!width=150 | Attendance
|-
|Europa League||16 July 2015 ||bgcolor="#FFFFCC"|1–1 || Dinamo Minsk ||3,650
|-
|A Group||26 July 2015 ||bgcolor="#FFCCCC"|2–3 ||Ludogorets ||3,360
|-
|A Group||8 August 2015 ||bgcolor="#FFCCCC"|0–1 ||Levski ||4,320
|-
|A Group||22 August 2015 ||bgcolor="#CCFFCC"|1–0 ||Montana ||1,500
|-
|A Group||11 September 2015 ||bgcolor="#CCFFCC"|2–1 ||Lokomotiv Plovdiv ||1,930
|-
|A Group||26 September 2015 ||bgcolor="#CCFFCC"|1–0 ||Pirin Blagoevgrad ||1,300
|-
|A Group||17 October 2015 ||bgcolor="#CCFFCC"|1–0 ||Slavia ||1,760
|-
|A Group||3 November 2015 ||bgcolor="#FFCCCC"|0–3 ||Beroe ||1,370
|-
|A Group||22 November 2015 ||bgcolor="#FFCCCC"|1–2 ||Botev Plovdiv ||1,060
|-
|A Group||1 December 2015 ||bgcolor="#BBBBBB"|1–1 ||Litex ||1,040
|-
|A Group||12 December 2015 ||bgcolor="#FFCCCC"|0–2 ||Ludogorets ||1,790
|-
|A Group||27 February 2016 ||bgcolor="#FFCCCC"|0–2 ||Levski ||3,700
|-
|A Group||6 March 2016 ||bgcolor="#FFFFCC"|1–1 ||Montana ||940
|-
|A Group||20 March 2016 ||bgcolor="#FFFFCC"|1–1 ||Lokomotiv Plovdiv ||760
|-
|A Group||9 April 2016 ||bgcolor="#FFFFCC"|1–1 ||Pirin Blagoevgrad ||780
|-
|A Group||23 April 2016 ||bgcolor="#CCFFCC"|3–2 ||Slavia ||840
|-
|A Group||6 May 2016 ||bgcolor="#CCFFCC"|1–0 ||Beroe ||580
|-
|A Group||14 May 2016 ||bgcolor="#CCFFCC"|3–0 ||Botev Plovdiv ||470
|-
|bgcolor="#C0C0C0"|
|bgcolor="#C0C0C0"|
|bgcolor="#C0C0C0"|
| Total attendance
|31,150
|-
|bgcolor="#C0C0C0"|
|bgcolor="#C0C0C0"|
|bgcolor="#C0C0C0"|
| Total league attendance
|27,500
|-
|bgcolor="#C0C0C0"|
|bgcolor="#C0C0C0"|
|bgcolor="#C0C0C0"|
| Average attendance
|1,731
|-
|bgcolor="#C0C0C0"|
|bgcolor="#C0C0C0"|
|bgcolor="#C0C0C0"|
| Average league attendance
|1,618

Club

Coaching staff
{|class="wikitable"
!Position
!Staff
|-
|-
|Manager|| Nikola Spasov
|-
|Assistant First Team Coach|| Emanuil Lukanov
|-
|Goalkeeper Coach|| Stoyan Stavrev
|-
|First Team Fitness Coach|| Veselin Markov
|-
|Individual Team Fitness Coach|| Viktor Bumbalov
|-
|Medical Director|| Dr. Petko Atev
|-
|Academy Manager|| Hristina Dimitrova
|-

Other information

Notes

References

PFC Cherno More Varna seasons
Cherno More Varna